St. Helens School District is a public school district in the U.S. state of Oregon that serves the cities of St. Helens and Columbia City.

Demographics
In the 2009 school year, the district had 43 students classified as homeless by the Department of Education, or 1.2% of students in the district.

Elementary schools

McBride Elementary School
McBride Elementary School is a school for Kindergartners to fifth graders. It is located at 2774 Columbia Boulevard. It is a low-lying one-story building located on the west side of town.

Lewis and Clark Elementary School
Lewis and Clark Elementary School is a school for Kindergarteners to fifth graders. It is located at 111 South 9th Street. It is a three-story building located on the east side of town.

Columbia City Elementary School
Columbia City Elementary School has just reopened beginning Sept 2017 for K-5th graders.

Middle school

St. Helens Middle School
St. Helens Middle School is for six to eighth graders.  It is a two-story building in the east side of town. The building was torn down and reconstructed in 2019.

Clubs and extra-curricular activities
It is currently hosting many extracurricular activities such as a homework club, where kids work in silence in the library. Other activities include geography club, Game club builders club, PRISM club (a space to discuss LGBT+ topics), game club, writing club, Spanish club, robotics club, Students of Color Union, and a debate team.

Sports
St Helens Middle School offers girls volleyball, girls and boys basketball, wrestling and track. There are also many other options such as football with SHYFL, club volleyball with CCVC Crushers, baseball, and basketball but these are not actually "school sports".

High schools
 St. Helens High School, grades 9-12
 Columbia County Education Campus, grades 9-12, alternative until 2018
 Plymouth High School, grades 9-12, alternative (New name of Columbia County Education Campus in new building)

References

External links
 
 St. Helens School Info Links
 School Info

School districts in Oregon
Education in Columbia County, Oregon
St. Helens, Oregon